A prayer wheel is a cylindrical wheel on a spindle made from metal, wood, stone, leather, or coarse cotton, widely used in Tibet and areas where Tibetan culture is predominant.

Traditionally, a mantra is written in Ranjana script or Tibetan script, on the outside of the wheel. The mantra Om mani padme hum is most commonly used, but other mantras may be used as well.

Also sometimes depicted are dakinis, Protectors and very often the eight auspicious symbols (ashtamangala). At the core of the cylinder is a "life tree" often made of wood or metal with certain mantras written on or wrapped around it. Many thousands (or in the case of larger prayer wheels, millions) of mantras are then wrapped around this life tree.

According to the Tibetan Buddhist tradition based on the lineage texts regarding prayer wheels, spinning such a wheel will have much the same meritorious effect as orally reciting the prayers.

Nomenclature and etymology 
Prayer wheel or mani wheel. The Tibetan term is a contraction: "" itself is a contraction of Sanskrit cintamani; "" is Tibetan for dharma; and "" or "" means chakrano.

The common term, “prayer wheel” is a double misnomer. A long strip of rolled-up paper bearing printed or inscribed mantras rather than prayers, per se, is inside the cylinder. The term “mantra mill”, in contrast to “prayer wheel”, is perhaps a better translation of the Tibetan , since a "mill" refers to a turning process that generates a particular output, in this case generating merit.

Origins and history 

The first prayer wheels, which are driven by wind, have been used in Tibet and China since the fourth century. The concept of the prayer wheel is a physical manifestation of the phrase "turning the wheel of Dharma", which describes the way in which the Buddha taught.

According to the Tibetan tradition, the prayer wheel lineage traces back to the famous Indian master, Nagarjuna. Tibetan texts also say that the practice was taught by the Indian Buddhist masters Tilopa and Naropa as well as the Tibetan masters Marpa and Milarepa. Kawaguchi mentions in his book that the prayer wheel originated in the Mani Lhakhang where Je Tsongkhapa invented it.

Prayer wheels originated from ‘The School of Shakyamuni sutra, volume 3 – pagoda and temple’ which states that:

Another theory, which seems more plausible, is that rotating mantras relate to numerous yogic or Tantric practices whereby the Tantric practitioner visualizes the mantra revolving around his or her nadis and especially around the meridian chakras such as the heart and crown. The prayer wheels are a visual aid for developing the capacity for these types of Tantric visualizations.

Practice 

According to the lineage texts on prayer wheels, prayer wheels are used to accumulate wisdom and merit (good karma) and to purify negativities (bad karma). In Buddhism, Buddhas and Bodhisattvas have created a variety of skillful means (upaya) to help bring practitioners ever closer to realizing enlightenment. The idea of spinning mantras relates to numerous Tantric practices whereby the Tantric practitioner visualizes mantras revolving around the nadis and especially around the meridian chakras such as the heart and crown. Therefore, prayer wheels are a visual aid for developing one's capacity for these types of Tantric visualizations.

The spiritual method for those practicing with a prayer wheel is very specific (with slight variations according to different Buddhist sects). The practitioner most often spins the wheel clockwise, as the direction in which the mantras are written is that of the movement of the sun across the sky. On rare occasions, advanced Tantric practitioners such as those of Senge Dongma, the Lion-Faced Dakini, spin prayer wheels counterclockwise to manifest a more wrathful protective energy. As the practitioner turns the wheel, it is best to focus the mind and repeat the Om Mani Padme Hum mantra. Not only does this increase the merit earned by the wheel's use, but it is a mind-stabilization technique that trains the mind while the body is in motion. Intoning the mani mantra with mindfulness and the "Bodhicitta" motivation dramatically enhances the effects of the prayer wheel. However, it is said that even turning it while distracted has benefits and merits, and it is stated in the lineage text that even insects that cross a prayer wheel's shadow will get some benefit.  Each revolution is as meritorious as reading the inscription aloud as many times as it is written on the scroll, and this means that the more Om Mani Padme Hum mantras that are inside a prayer wheel, the more powerful it is. It is best to turn the wheel with a gentle rhythm and not too fast or frantically. While turning smoothly, one keeps in mind the motivation and spirit of compassion and bodhichitta (the noble mind that aspires to full enlightenment for the benefit of all beings).

The benefits attributed to the practice of turning the wheel are vast. Not only does it help wisdom, compassion and bodhichitta arise in the practitioner, it also enhances siddhis (spiritual powers such as clairvoyance, precognition, reading others thoughts, etc.).The practitioner can repeat the mantra as many times as possible during the turning of the wheel, stabilizing a calm, meditative mind. At the end of a practice session, there is a Tibetan Buddhist tradition of dedicating any accumulated merits that one may have gathered during practice to the benefit of all sentient beings. Then Om Ah Hum 3 times. This is customary with Tibetans upon completing any Buddhist practice, including the practice of the prayer wheel.

Thubten Zopa Rinpoche has commented that installing a prayer wheel has the capacity to completely transform a place, which becomes "...peaceful, pleasant, and conducive to the mind."

Simply touching a prayer wheel is said to bring great purification to negative karmas and obscurations.

Types

Human-powered

Handheld wheels 

The handheld prayer wheel has a cylindrical, generally sheet-metal body (often beautifully embossed) mounted on a metal shaft or pin set into a wooden or metal handle that turns on a circular bearing commonly made of Turbinella (conch) shell. The cylinder itself is affixed with a cord or chain terminating in a small weight allowing it to be spun by a slight rotation of the wrist. The weighted chain, known as a “governor” in Western technology, stabilizes the wheel and keeps it spinning with less input from the practitioner than would otherwise be the case. When the prayer wheel is spun in prayer, the mantras inside become potent with the person's intent, allowing the practitioner to accumulate wisdom and merit.

Large wheels 

Prayer wheels larger than human size are to be seen in separate rooms in Tibetan Buddhist temples and can be set in motion by pilgrims. With the help of a small bell the number of revolutions can be counted. The cylinders of fixed prayer wheels are often inscribed with the formula “Om mani padme hum” (meaning “jewel in the lotus”) in ornamental Lantsa (Ranjana) letters.

Row installations 
Many monasteries around Tibet have large, fixed, metal wheels set side by side in a row. Passersby can turn the entire row of wheels simply by sliding their hands over each one. They are set in motion by pilgrims who circumambulate the building in a clockwise direction.

Powered by other means

Water wheels 

This type of prayer wheel is simply a prayer wheel that is turned by flowing water. The water that is touched by the wheel is said to become blessed and carries its purifying power into all life forms in the oceans and lakes that it feeds into.

Fire wheels 

This wheel is turned by the heat of a candle or electric light. The light emitted from the prayer wheel then purifies the negative karmas of the living beings it touches.

Wind wheels 
This type of wheel is turned by wind. The wind that touches the prayer wheel helps alleviate the negative karma of those it touches.

Electric dharma wheels 

Some prayer wheels are powered by electric motors. , as these electric wheels are sometimes known, contain one thousand copies of the mantra of Chenrezig and many copies of other mantras. The  can be accompanied by lights and music if one so chooses.

Electricity can certainly be considered similar to the above sources of energy for PW (water, fire, wind). The merit generated by the PW is due to the power of the Dharma Texts and Mantras; not necessarily the "power" which rotates them. These PW turn all day, all night, all through the year. The Lamas and practitioners who build, maintain and pay for the electricity rightly help to generate and dedicate the merit.

Gallery

See also

References

Bibliography

External links 

 Hand crafted wooden prayer wheels
 Dharma-haven.org
 Picture of prayer wheel at Muktinath, plus backgrounds
 Nyingma Prayer Wheels for World Peace
 The Internet Prayer Wheel 
  Online Prayer Wheel 

Buddhist ritual implements
Prayer
Buddhist religious objects
Tibetan culture
Tibetan Buddhist practices
Tibetan Buddhist ritual implements
Tantric practices
Articles containing video clips